Gap Civil Township is one of seven townships in Alleghany County, North Carolina, United States. The township had a population of 4,474 according to the 2010 census.

Gap Civil Township occupies  in central Alleghany County. The only incorporated municipality within Gap Civil Township is the town of Sparta, the county seat of Alleghany County.

References

Townships in Alleghany County, North Carolina
Townships in North Carolina